Dirona is a genus of sea slugs, Pacific Ocean nudibranchs, marine, opisthobranch gastropod mollusks in the family Dironidae.

Dirona is the type genus of the family Dironidae.

This genus is characterized by large, broad cerata.

Distribution
These nudibranchs live on the West Coast of North America and Central America, some extending west into Japanese and Russian waters.

Habitat
Dironids live in various habitats, including the intertidal zone of rocky shores, bays and estuaries.

Life habits
Most species in this genus eat various species of bryozoans. Some also feed on hydroids and ascidians.

Species
Species within this genus include:
 Dirona akkeshiensis Baba, 1957
Dirona albolineata MacFarland, 1905
Dirona pellucida Volodchenko, 1941
Dirona picta MacFarland, 1905
Species brought into synonymy
 Dirona aurantia Hurst, 1966: synonym of Dirona pellucida Volodchenko, 1941

References

 
Dironidae